Pseudochazara pelopea is a species of butterfly in the family Nymphalidae. It is confined to Lebanon, Turkey, the Caucasus, Syria, Turkmenistan and Kopet-Dagh.

Flight period 
The species is univoltine and is on wing from June to August.

Food plants
Larvae feed on grasses.

Subspecies
Pseudochazara pelopea pelopea
Pseudochazara pelopea persica (Christoph, 1877) the Caucasus Major and Minor, the Armenian Highland and Talysh; Adana, Adıyaman, Ağrı, Bingöl, Bitlis, Diyarbakır, Elazığ, Erzurum, Gaziantep, Gümüşhane, Hakkari, Kars, Kayseri, Malatya, Maraş, Mardin, Muş, Rize, Siirt, Sivas, Tunceli, Urfa, Van, Şırnak, Iğdır – Turkey
Pseudochazara pelopea tekkensis (Heyne, [1895]) Kopet Dagh - Turkmenistan/Iran border

References

 Satyrinae of the Western Palearctic - Pseudochazara pelopea

Pseudochazara
Butterflies described in 1832